Estradiol cypionate/testosterone enanthate (EC/TE), sold under the brand name Supligol, is an injectable combination medication of estradiol cypionate (EC), an estrogen, and testosterone enanthate (TE), an androgen/anabolic steroid, which is used in menopausal hormone therapy for women, to treat prostatic hypertrophy in men, to treat osteoporosis, and to suppress lactation in women, among other uses. It contains 4 mg EC and 80 mg TE (57.5 mg free testosterone) in oil solution in each ampoule and is administered by intramuscular injection once every 3 to 6 weeks for hormone therapy in women. The medication was marketed by 1976 and remains available today in Paraguay.

See also
 List of combined sex-hormonal preparations

References

Combined estrogen–androgen formulations